Rafael Manzano (born 21 March 1975) is a Venezuelan swimmer. He competed in the men's 4 × 200 metre freestyle relay event at the 1996 Summer Olympics.

References

1975 births
Living people
Venezuelan male swimmers
Olympic swimmers of Venezuela
Swimmers at the 1996 Summer Olympics
Place of birth missing (living people)
20th-century Venezuelan people